Asperisporium is a genus of ascomycete fungi whose members are plant pathogens.

Gallery

References

Capnodiales
Dothideomycetes genera